NGC 462 is an elliptical galaxy located in the Pisces constellation. It was discovered by Albert Marth on 23 October 1864. Dreyer, creator of the New General Catalogue, originally described it as "extremely faint, very small, stellar". The word stellar clearly suggests an initial misidentification of NGC 462 as a star.

See also 
 Elliptical galaxy 
 List of NGC objects (1–1000)
 Pisces (constellation)

References

External links 
 
 
 SEDS

Elliptical galaxies
Pisces (constellation)
0462
18641023
Discoveries by Albert Marth
004667